Senator Flinn may refer to:

Shea Flinn (born 1973), Tennessee State Senate
William Flinn (1851–1924), Pennsylvania State Senate

See also
Senator Flynn (disambiguation)